William Maynard may refer to:
William Maynard, 1st Baron Maynard (1586–1640)
William Maynard, 2nd Baron Maynard (1620s–1689)
William Maynard (footballer) (1853–1921), English football player
Sir William Maynard, 1st Baronet (1641–1685), English MP for Essex 1685
Sir William Maynard, 4th Baronet (1721–1772), English MP for Essex 1759–1772
William S. Maynard (1802–1866), U.S. politician
William H. Maynard (1786–1832), American lawyer, newspaper editor and politician from New York
Bill Maynard (1928–2018), English actor and comedian